ALE International SAS, trading as Alcatel-Lucent Enterprise, is a French software company headquartered in Colombes, France, providing communication equipment and services to telecommunications companies, ISPs and data providers. The company was founded after China Huaxin Post and Telecom Technologies acquired Alcatel-Lucent's Enterprise division in 2014. Since March 2019, Nicolas Brunel has served as President of Alcatel-Lucent Entreprise.

History

Origins

The company has origins in French telecommunications company Alcatel (acronym for the Société Alsacienne de Constructions Atomiques, de Télécommunications et d'Électronique), that formed as a result of a series of merges and acquisitions by Compagnie Générale d'Electricité (CGE) in the late '60s. However, the predecessors of the company have been a part of telecommunications industry since the late 19th century.

In 2006, Alcatel-Lucent was formed by the merger of France-based Alcatel and U.S.-based Lucent Technologies, the latter being a successor of AT&T's Western Electric and Bell Labs.

Spinoffs and mergers
Alcatel-Lucent Enterprise spun off its Enterprise division, on 1 October 2014, to Chinese company China Huaxin Post and Telecommunication Economy Development Center (later renamed China Huaxin Post and Telecom Technologies), which bought 85% of its with Alcatel-Lucent keeping a 15% share. ALE International continued to use the Alcatel-Lucent brand name, now licensed from Nokia, which purchased Alcatel-Lucent in 2015. In 2016, Alcatel-Lucent was merged into Nokia Networks, while Alcatel-Lucent Enterprise continued as a separate enterprise.

Technology and organization
The company develops infrastructure software for access networking, data centers, wireless networks, voice-over-IP, unified communications, contact centers, clouds, among others. In 2019, ALE was the first vendor to release a certified Wi-Fi 6 outdoor access point. In April 2021, it released two new Wi-Fi 6 certified access points based on Wi-Fi 6 standard for higher bandwidth and connectivity. In May 2021, the company designed Rainbow Classroom, a cloud-based virtual classroom for educational institutions with the communication tools for remote group learning.

Alcatel-Lucent Enterprise is privately owned, with its main offices at 32 Avenue Kleber in Colombes, France. The company provides networking, communications and cloud infrastructure for telecommunications enterprises around the world. The company operates its business through three main corporate divisions: Core Networking, Access and Other.

References

Alcatel-Lucent
Telecommunications companies established in 2014
Telecommunications companies of France
French companies established in 2014
2014 mergers and acquisitions
Electronics companies of France